Cumbres Borrascosas is a Mexican telenovela, produced by Ernesto Alonso for Televisa in 1979. It is based on the 1847 novel by Emily Brontë, Wuthering Heights

Cast 
Alma Muriel as Cathy
Gonzalo Vega as Heathcliff
Bertha Moss
Rocío Brambila
Mario Casillas
Karina Duprez
Arturo Benavides
Juan Antonio Edwards
Sergio Jiménez
Alfonso Iturralde
José Bardina

References

External links 

Mexican telenovelas
1979 telenovelas
Televisa telenovelas
Spanish-language telenovelas
1979 Mexican television series debuts
1979 Mexican television series endings
Films based on Wuthering Heights